Tim Eicke  (born 27 July 1966) is a German-born British barrister and Judge of the European Court of Human Rights.

Education 

Eicke studied German law at the University of Passau in south-east Germany, graduating in 1988. From there, he crossed the channel to Britain where he undertook further study in both Scottish and English law at the University of Dundee. He is fluent in German and English and is highly proficient in French. In June 2017, Eicke received an Honorary Doctorate from the University of Dundee.

Career 

After working as a legal consultant for an oil and gas information company, Eicke was called to the bar in 1993 at Middle Temple. In 1999, Eicke joined Essex Court Chambers gaining expertise in the fields of European Union and international human rights law and regularly appearing in the European Court of Justice, the European Court of Human Rights as well as domestic courts including the UK Supreme Court.
Between 2004 and 2015, Mr. Eicke was a trustee/board member of INTERIGHTS, the International Centre for the Legal Protection of Human Rights, in London. Between 2000 and 2007, he also served on the board of the Advice on Individual Rights in Europe (AIRE center).

Eicke was on the panel of counsel for the Equality and Human Rights Commission (2011-2015) in addition to editing the European Human Rights Reports.

Eicke was appointed Queen's Counsel in 2011 and was subsequently elected as Britain's judge in the European Court of Human Rights in 2016 after a clear majority of representatives of the Council of Europe voted him in.

He seated in the Case Chowdury and others v. Greece, in which the AIRE center was a third party. Due to past links with this organisation, this has been pointed out as a possible conflict of interest.

Memberships 
Administrative and Constitutional Law Bar Association, American Society of International Law; Bar European Group; British-German Jurists Association; Commercial Bar Association (COMBAR); Immigration Law Practitioners' Association; International Court of Arbitration; Justice Expert Panel on Human Rights in the EU; Lawyers for Liberty; Lincolns Inn; London Common Law and Commercial Bar Association; UK Association of European  Law.

References

External links 
 Official Website of the European Court of Human Rights

University of Passau alumni
German emigrants to England
Alumni of the University of Dundee
European Union Civil Service Tribunal judges
British King's Counsel
1966 births
21st-century English judges
Judges of the European Court of Human Rights
Living people
Jurists from Hanover
Members of the Middle Temple
British judges of international courts and tribunals
British officials of the European Union